Ante Pivčević (13 June 1926 – 18 August 1997) was a Croatian sailor. He competed in the Finn event at the 1960 Summer Olympics.

References

External links
 

1926 births
1997 deaths
Croatian male sailors (sport)
Olympic sailors of Yugoslavia
Sailors at the 1960 Summer Olympics – Finn
Sportspeople from Dubrovnik